Daniel Tji Hak Soun (September 9, 1921 – March 12, 1993) was a bishop of the Roman Catholic Diocese of Wonju.

Biography
Daniel Tji Hak Soun was ordained a priest on December 15, 1952.

On March 22, 1965, Pope Paul VI appointed him Bishop of Wonju. He was consecrated bishop on June 29, 1965 by Antonio del Giudice. Co-consecrators were the Bishop Thomas F. Quinlan of the Diocese of Chunchon and Bishop John A. Choi Jae-seon of the Diocese of Busan.

References

South Korean Roman Catholic bishops
1921 births
1993 deaths
People from North Hwanghae
Bishops appointed by Pope Paul VI
Chungju Ji clan
Roman Catholic bishops of Wonju